Republic is a British republican pressure group advocating the replacement of the United Kingdom's monarchy with a de jure parliamentary republic. It is a member organisation of Common Cause (the alliance of republican movements in The Commonwealth) and the Alliance of European Republican Movements and is currently the only organisation solely campaigning for a republican constitution for Britain. Republic states that its mission is: "the replacement of hereditary monarchy with a democratic republican constitution". , Robbie Parkin is the current chair, and Graham Smith is the chief executive officer of Republic.

History

Originally created by a small group of republicans in London in 1983, Republic was reinvented as a campaigning pressure group in 2006, when it became formally set up as a limited company (Republic Campaign Ltd) with a board of directors and executive office. During the period between the announcement of the engagement of Prince William and Catherine Middleton in 2010 and the Diamond Jubilee of Elizabeth II in 2012, the group's supporters increased from around 9,000 to around 30,000, with around 500 new members being gained at the time of the 2011 Royal Wedding. By 2015, the group had two full-time members of staff and an income of £140,000. In 2016, it had over 5,000 paying members and about 35,000 online supporters.

Campaigns and issues

CEO Graham Smith has criticised hereditary power as being "absurd", and monarchy as an outdated political institution that "abuses its position, abuses public money and which gives politicians too much power." Following the death of Elizabeth II, Republic briefly suspended public comments out of respect for the late Queen, and then returned to campaigning following the proclamation of accession of Charles III. Republic had previously stated that after the death of Elizabeth II it intends to mount a campaign for a referendum on the future of the monarchy. The group plans to do this during the period between the Queen's funeral and the coronation of Charles III.

Royal finances

Republic asserts that there is a lack of transparency and accountability with respect to the funding of the monarchy. The group believes the royal finances should be independently audited by the National Audit Office, like all other central government departments, and that the monarchy's exemption from the Freedom of Information Act should be removed.

Republic's response to the annual royal finance reports is reported in the media. In 2009, while Buckingham Palace claimed the total cost of the monarchy to be £41.5m, Republic estimated the figure at £334 million, once additional costs such as royal security had been taken into account.

Republic's calculations do not factor in the profits of the Crown Estate, which are transferred to national funds in return for the civil list (a payment superseded by the Sovereign Grant in 2012); they assert that the Crown Estate is the property of the monarch only in their capacity as Head of State, and therefore state property.

Prince Charles and the Duchy of Cornwall
In May 2007, Republic persuaded Brian Iddon MP to table an early day motion about the lack of transparency in the Duchy of Cornwall's accounts. The Duke of Cornwall was at that time Prince Charles, the future King Charles III. Following a legal ruling in 2011 that the Duchy of Cornwall was separate from Prince Charles for the purposes of regulation, Republic asked HM Revenue and Customs to investigate if the Duchy should still be exempt from tax. The tax exemption is based on the assumption that the Duchy estate is inseparable from the tax exempt person of Prince Charles, which has become open to question. In 2013, lobbying by Republic resulted in William Nye, Prince Charles's private secretary, appearing before the Public Accounts Committee to explain the Duchy's tax arrangements.

Republic regularly criticised Prince Charles for expressing forthright views and lobbying on political issues, which the group said was unconstitutional. It also called on the British Government to stop subsidising Charles' £16.3m annual income through grants and tax breaks. In 2015, Republic launched a campaign and petition, Take Back the Duchy, to abolish the Duchy of Cornwall and transfer its land and assets to the Crown Estate. In December 2015, a freedom of information request by Republic revealed that Prince Charles had routine access to confidential government papers.

Oaths of allegiance
In 2008, Republic launched a campaign to give republicans an alternative oath of allegiance. The campaign began with an Early Day Motion and was taken up by human rights lawyer Louise Christian.

2011 Royal wedding
In advance of the 2011 wedding of Prince William and Catherine Middleton, the tourist organisation VisitBritain said that the event would be good for tourism. In response, Republic made a freedom of information request for VisitBritain documents which indicated that royal weddings had in the past had a negative effect on tourism. Republic held an alternative street party in London at the Royal Wedding, "celebrating democracy and people power rather than inherited privilege", along with other events across the UK's major cities. Republic's London event had initially been blocked by Camden Council.

BBC coverage of the monarchy 
Republic has claimed that the BBC displays bias in relation to its reporting of royal matters. The documentary The Diamond Queen was criticised for this: in a letter to the chairman of the BBC Trust, Chris Patten, Republic's chief executive, Graham Smith, argued that the programme breached BBC guidelines on impartiality. In his letter, Smith claimed the series was subject to "distortions, half-truths and fabrications".

Requests for investigating and military discharging of Prince Andrew 
In March 2016, Smith filed a formal report to the police, requesting an investigation into allegations that Prince Andrew, Duke of York had caused damaged to sensor-operated gates in Windsor Great Park by forcing them open in his Range Rover to avoid going an extra mile on his way home. The Thames Valley force dismissed the reports due to lack of details.

On 13 January 2022, Republic released an open letter, signed by more than 150 military veterans, addressed to the Queen in her capacity as head of state and commander-in-chief of the armed forces, which contained a request that Prince Andrew be stripped of all his honorary military roles. In the letter, which was sent from Republic's London address, the signatories expressed "upset and anger" in the wake of a ruling (made the day before by the New York judge Lewis A. Kaplan) that Prince Andrew must face a civil lawsuit in the U.S. for alleged sexual assault brought by Virginia Giuffre, and they argued that it was "untenable" for the Duke of York to retain his positions in the armed forces. On receipt of the letter that day, Buckingham Palace declined to comment. Later in the day, Prince Andrew's military affiliations and royal patronages were returned to the Queen, and it was announced that he would defend the lawsuit as a "private citizen".

Legal context
Advocacy of the replacement of the monarchy with a republic has been an imprisonable offence in law. The Treason Felony Act 1848 prohibits the advocacy of a republic in print. The penalty for such advocacy, even if the republic is to be set up by peaceful means, is lifetime imprisonment. This Act remains in force in the United Kingdom. However, under the Human Rights Act 1998, the Law Lords have held that although the Treason Felony Act remains on the statute books it must be interpreted so as to be compatible with the Human Rights Act, and therefore no longer prohibits peaceful republican activity.

See also
 Labour for a Republic
 List of advocates of republicanism in the United Kingdom
 Republicanism in the United Kingdom
 Scottish republicanism

References

External links 

Republicanism in the United Kingdom
Republican organizations
Political organisations based in London
Political advocacy groups in England
Political advocacy groups in the United Kingdom
Organizations established in 1983
1983 establishments in the United Kingdom